The 2016 WAC women's basketball tournament was a tournament which was held on March 9–12, 2016, at the Orleans Arena in Paradise, Nevada. The #1 seed in the tournament will receive a first round bye to the semifinals. Grand Canyon did not compete in the 2016 women's basketball tournament. As a D2 to D1 transitioning school, they are ineligible to compete in the NCAA tournament until the 2018 season, so they can not win the conference tournament since the winner received an automatic bid to the NCAA Tournament. However Grand Canyon is eligible to win the regular season title and is eligible to compete in the WNIT or WBI should they be invited. New Mexico State won their 2nd straight WAC Tournament to earn an automatic trip to the 2016 NCAA tournament.

Seeds

Schedule

Bracket

See also
 2016 WAC men's basketball tournament

References

2015–16 Western Athletic Conference women's basketball season
WAC women's basketball tournament
WAC women's basketball tournament
Basketball competitions in the Las Vegas Valley
College basketball tournaments in Nevada
Women's sports in Nevada
March 2016 sports events in the United States
College sports tournaments in Nevada